Rommy Rebeca Romero Villalba (born 11 May 1989), usually known as Rebeca Romero, is a Paraguayan footballer who plays as a midfielder. She has been a member of the Paraguay women's national team.

International career
Romero played for Paraguay at senior level in the 2014 Copa América Femenina.

References

1989 births
Living people
Women's association football midfielders
Women's association football defenders
Paraguayan women's footballers
Paraguay women's international footballers
Cerro Porteño players